Foxtrot is a dance and style of music.

Foxtrot or Fox trot may also refer to:

Arts, entertainment, and media

Films
 Foxtrot (1976 film), a British drama film directed by Arturo Ripstein
 Foxtrot (2017 film), an Israeli drama film

Music
 Foxtrot (album), 1972 album by Genesis

Other uses in arts, entertainment, and media
 FoxTrot (comic strip), syndicated comic strip by Bill Amend
 The Foxtrot, television play

Horses
 Fox trot (gait), horse gait
 Missouri Fox Trotter, a breed of horse

Other uses
 The letter F in the NATO phonetic alphabet
 Foxtrot class submarine
Emergency Action Message